Josh Zeller (born 19 October 2000) is an athlete from Great Britain who competes as a hurdler.

Zeller won the European Junior Championships in 2019, and was the champion at the England U20 Championships in both the 110m hurdles and 60m hurdles. 

Zeller was named in the British squad for the 2022 World Athletics Championships – Men's 110 metres hurdles. On his major championship debut Zeller came through the heats to qualify for the 110 metres hurdle final in which he finished fifth.

References

2000 births
Living people
World Athletics Championships athletes for Great Britain
British male hurdlers
21st-century British people